Terry Griggs is a Canadian author. Her book of short stories Quickening was a finalist at the 1991 Governor General's Awards, and she won the Marian Engel Award in 2003.

Originally from Manitoulin Island, where her family operated a fishing lodge near Little Current, she studied English literature at the University of Western Ontario.

She presently lives in Stratford, Ontario.

Bibliography
 1990: Quickening (Porcupine's Quill)
 1995: The Lusty Man (Porcupine's Quill)
 2002: Rogue's Wedding (Random House Canada)
 2009: Thought You Were Dead (Biblioasis)
 2009: Quickening (Biblioasis)
 2010: Nieve (Biblioasis)
 2017: The Discovery of Honey (Biblioasis, 
 2018: The Iconoclast's Journal (Biblioasis,  

Cat's Eye Corner series
 2000: Cat's Eye Corner (Raincoast Books) 
 2004: The Silver Door (Raincoast Books)
 2006: Invisible Ink (Raincoast Books)

References

Living people
Year of birth missing (living people)
20th-century Canadian novelists
20th-century Canadian short story writers
21st-century Canadian novelists
21st-century Canadian short story writers
20th-century Canadian women writers
21st-century Canadian women writers
Writers from Ontario
Canadian women novelists
Canadian women short story writers
People from Stratford, Ontario
People from Manitoulin Island
University of Ottawa alumni